Faith Ladies F.C. is a Ghanaian professional women's football club based in Dansoman in the Greater Accra Region of Ghana. The club features in the Ghana Women’s Premier League (GWPL). The club was formed in 2004.

History 
In 2004, the club was formed in Dansoman, a suburban town in Greater Accra Region of Ghana as one of the women's association football clubs in Ghana. In 2021, the club won the Greater Accra Regional Football Association (GARFA) Women's Division One League Zone A to qualify for the Regional Women's Zonal playoff and champions of champions (championship final for the GARFA Women's League). The won the championship final against Army Ladies and won the Regional Women's Zonal playoff for the Southern Zone to qualify for the Ghana Women's Premier League for the first time in the club's history.

Prior to the start of their first top flight season, the club appointed Edna Quagraine as the club's head coach. In their debut season (2021–22 season) in the GWPL, they placed second in the Southern Zone behind Hasaacas Ladies. Their second-place finish earned them qualification into the Ghana Women's Super Cup.

On 25 September 2022, they won the 2022 Ghana Women's Super Cup defeating the League Champions, Ampem Darkoa by 3–1 in the final.

Grounds 
The club plays their home matches at the Carl Reindorf Park in Dansoman.

Honours

Domestic 

 Ghana Women's Super Cup

 Winners (1): 2022

 GARFA Women's Division One League

 Winners (1): 2020–21

 Division One Regional Women's Zonal League

 Winners (1): 2021

Notable players 
For details on notable Faith Ladies F.C. footballers see :Category:Faith Ladies F.C. players.

See also 

 Women's football in Ghana

References

External links 

 Faith Ladies on Twitter
 Faith Ladies on Facebook

2004 establishments in Ghana
Association football clubs established in 2004
Women's football clubs in Ghana